Solar power in Florida has been increasing, as the cost of solar power systems using photovoltaics (PV) has decreased in recent years. 
Florida has low electricity costs compared with other states, which makes individual solar investment less attractive. 
Florida ranks ninth nationally in solar resource strength according to the National Renewable Energy Laboratory and tenth in solar generation by the Solar Energy Industries Association.

Government support
In 2006, the State of Florida enacted the Florida Renewable Energy Technologies and Energy Efficiency Act, which provided consumers with rebates and tax credits for solar photovoltaic systems. 
The program was closed in 2010. 
Later, the Florida Public Service Commission mandated that the state's large utilities offer individual solar rebates. 
The program opened in 2011 and was closed in 2015 after the Commission deemed it to not be cost-effective for non-solar customers.

In 2008, Florida adopted a net metering rule that allows any electric utility customer generating up to 2 MW (2,000 kW) of power to use net metering, which provides a retail rate credit for kilowatt-hours of electricity delivered to the utility, rolled over from month to month, and paid out in cash by the utility once a year at the avoided cost rate.

The federal Residential Energy Efficient Property Credit (income tax credit on IRS Form 5695) for residential PV and solar thermal was extended in December 2015 to remain at 30% of system cost (parts and installation) for systems put into service by the end of 2019, then 26% until the end of 2020, and then 22% until the end of 2021. It applies to a taxpayer's principal and/or second residences, but not to a property that is rented out. There is no maximum cap on the credit, and the credit can be applied toward the Alternative Minimum Tax, and any excess credit (greater than that year's tax liability) can be rolled into the following year.

Large-scale facilities 
In 2009, Florida Power & Light built the state's first solar power plant, the FPL DeSoto Next Generation Solar Energy Center. 
At the time, the 25-MW plant was the largest of its kind. 
In 2010, FPL built the world's first hybrid solar-natural gas energy center.

The state's largest solar plant is the 75 MW FPL Martin Next Generation Solar Energy Center, in Martin County operated by Florida Power and Light. 
It was the world's first hybrid solar-natural gas energy center and is a concentrated solar power (CSP) plant using solar thermal instead of photovoltaic technology. 
No additional CSP plants are under development in Florida, although in 2007 a 300 MW fresnel CSP plant had been planned.

The state's largest photovoltaic plant is the 25 MW DeSoto Next Generation Solar Energy Center, operated by Florida Power and Light, completed in 2009. Florida Power and Light also operates the Space Coast Next Generation Solar Energy Center, a 10 MW photovoltaic facility near the Kennedy Space Center.

The 100 MW Sorrento Solar Farm was expected to become Florida's largest photovoltaic solar farm with 40 MW of photovoltaic capacity already under construction in Lake County. However the company Blue Chip Energy became insolvent and the equipment and farm site was sold at a public auction in 2013.

Florida Power and Light announced in October 2014 that it would build three more power plants by the end of 2016. The three plants together generate 225 MW, approximately the same as the total solar power installed in the entire state at the time. 

Tampa Electric Company is building a 2 MW farm at the Tampa International Airport. Gulf Power Company and the U.S. military announced contracts for the construction of 3 large plants in Florida: a 50 MW project at Saufley Field in Pensacola, a 40 MW project being at Holley Field in Navarre, and a 30 MW project at Eglin Air Force Base.

In April 2015, Duke Energy Florida proposed to build 500MW of solar in the next ten years.

Set to go live on January 1, 2018, the 20-megawatt Tallahassee Solar Farm is still currently under construction on 120 acres of the property of Tallahassee International Airport (TLH). Even though it has reached capacity a second solar farm is being planned for the city.

Duke Energy and Walt Disney World built a five-megawatt solar farm near Epcot Center which has been called the Walt Disney World Solar Facility, or 'Hidden Mickey'. It is visible from the air as a giant Mickey Mouse shape. It sells power to Walt Disney World. Disney World will soon be adding a new solar farm ten times larger than the Hidden Mickey farm. Reedy Creek Improvement District and Origis Energy are in agreement to build the farm on the western edge of Disney's property. It will provide renewable solar power to the Reedy Creek Improvement District and to Disney World.

In April 2018, a new Florida town just north of Fort Myers called Babcock Ranch, began attempting to become fully solar-powered. Florida Power and Light partnered with town founders to build a 75-megawatt solar-generating facility that's already running. The land was purchased in 2006 and more than 90% is being preserved for wildlife. The town's developers hope its success will keep the federal government from imposing high tariffs on solar energy, and keep the energy source in private hands. Babcock Ranch developer Syd Kitson has said that Florida has done a good job of embracing solar energy.

Tampa Electric currently has a plan to build a 350-acre solar farm in rural Pasco County which is being challenged by neighbors who oppose the project for visual aesthetic reasons. A county ordinance has been proposed restricting where solar farms can be located in the future.

Solar panels

Developers in Florida have announced the addition of solar panels on all new homes in several subdivisions.

In 2013, it was discovered that Blue Chip Energy was selling fraudulent solar panels to hundreds of consumers throughout Florida.

Statistics

Potential generation
Solar energy is the state's most abundant energy resource and estimates have placed the state's potential at 2,902 GW, which would produce about 5,274,479 GWh, an amount much larger than the state and countries's total electricity consumption of 231,210 GWh and 4,125,060 GWh in 2010. Florida is one of only two states with no potential for conventional wind power, the other being Mississippi, and will need to either import energy from other states during overcast days and at night, or provide adequate grid energy storage. Most of the potential is from photovoltaics, which provides no storage. The state has some potential for concentrated solar power, but the potential is estimated at 0.13 GW. Taller, 140 meter hub height wind turbines allow up to 153 GW of wind turbines in Florida.

Installed capacity

See also

Florida Amendment 1 (2016)
Solar power in the United States
Renewable energy in the United States

References

External links

Floridians for solar
Florida Solar Energy Center
Florida Solar Energy Industries Association
 Florida Alliance for Renewable Energy
 Florida Renewable Energy Association
 Cost calculator for solar hot water system in Florida  
 Cost Calculator for solar electric system in Florida
 IRS Form 5695 - Residential Energy Credits and instructions

Energy in Florida
Florida
Solar power in Florida